Kermia foraminata is a species of sea snail, a marine gastropod mollusk in the family Raphitomidae.

This is a nomen dubium.

Description
The length of the shell attains 9 mm, its diameter 2.75 mm.

The three specimens before the author (J.C. Melvill) are alike in shape, two are dark-brown in colour, the third a paler ochre yellow. The clathrations are beautifully regular, and in a young specimen the point of junction between the longitudinal and spiral lirae is gemmuled  with shining small papillae. The shell contains seven or eight whorls. The aperture is acute. The outer lip is thickened. The crenulated sinus is wide, but not cut deeply. The  columella is nearly straight.

Distribution
This marine species occurs off Karachi, Pakistan.

References

 Reeve, Proc. Zool. Soc. Lond., 1845, p. 118

External links
 
 Melvill J.C. (1898). Further investigations into the molluscan fauna of the Arabian Sea, Persian Gulf, and the Gulf of Oman, with the descriptions of forty species. Memoirs of the Manchester Literary and Philosophical Society. 42(4): 1-40, pls 1-2
 Kilburn, R. N. (2009). Genus Kermia (Mollusca: Gastropoda: Conoidea: Conidae: Raphitominae) in South African Waters, with Observations on the Identities of Related Extralimital Species. African Invertebrates. 50(2): 217-236

foraminata
Gastropods described in 1845